Ignacy Machowski (5 July 1920 – 11 January 2001) was a Polish actor. He appeared in more than fifty films from 1954 to 1999.

Selected filmography

References

External links 

1920 births
2001 deaths
Burials at Powązki Cemetery
Polish male film actors
Recipient of the Meritorious Activist of Culture badge